Kalma may refer to:
Kalma (goddess), a Finnish goddess
Kalma, an Islamic oath of allegiance.
Niko Hurme, a Finnish rock musician, stage-name Kalma
Alprazolam, a psychiatric medication, available under brand names including Kalma
Kalma, Sudan, relocation camp in Sudan
Kalma, Estonia, village in Saaremaa Parish, Saare County, Estonia
Six Kalimas, phrases articulating Muslim belief
Kalma Airport, Wonsan, Kangwon-do, North Korea
Kalmasaari, a divided island in the Finland-Russia border